Franco Lazzaroni (born 6 February 1988 in Sarmiento, Santa Fe) is an Argentine footballer who plays as a centre-back.

References

1988 births
Living people
Argentine footballers
Argentine expatriate footballers
Argentine Primera División players
Primera Nacional players
Torneo Argentino A players
Paraguayan Primera División players
Club Atlético Colón footballers
Tiro Federal footballers
Racing de Córdoba footballers
Defensa y Justicia footballers
Newell's Old Boys footballers
San Martín de San Juan footballers
Atlético de Rafaela footballers
Club Sol de América footballers
Ferro Carril Oeste footballers
Gimnasia y Esgrima de Jujuy footballers
Boca Unidos footballers
Argentine expatriate sportspeople in Paraguay
Expatriate footballers in Paraguay
Association football defenders